The Wobeon Music Festival ( Also known as Wobeon Fest) is a music festival held in Austin, Texas, United States. It is held annually.

The Festival has featured musicians from over 75 countries since it began in 2011

The festival was founded by Jakes Srinivasan.

Featured performers
Performers at the festival have included:

Music festivals in Texas